Here Comes the Groom is a 1951 American musical romantic comedy film produced and directed by Frank Capra and starring Bing Crosby and Jane Wyman. Based on a story by Robert Riskin and Liam O'Brien, the film is about a foreign correspondent who has five days to win back his former fiancée, or he'll lose the orphans he adopted. Filmed from late November 1950 to January 29, 1951, the film was released in the United States by Paramount Pictures on September 20, 1951.

Plot
Newspaper reporter Pete (Bing Crosby) works in a Paris orphanage. His charming way with children and music enables him to find homes for even the most troubled kids. One afternoon, Mr. and Mrs. Godfrey (Alan Reed and Minna Gombell), an American couple, come to the orphanage to adopt Bobby, a boy they saw in one of the ads Pete ran in his newspaper. Bobby misbehaves, but when Pete discovers that Mr. Godfrey plays for the Boston Symphony Orchestra, he quickly produces a young blind opera wunderkind, Theresa (Anna Maria Alberghetti), who sings her way into the Godfreys' hearts.

Later that night, Pete dreams that the fiancée he left behind in America, Emmadel (Jane Wyman) has visited. She appears in a hologram atop his record player, scolding him for leaving her at the altar and talks about the children they might have had. Filled with regret, Pete arranges to adopt both Bobby and his little sister Suzi and bring them to Boston, where he'll marry Emmadel. American authorities inform him that he must marry within five days or the adoption will be void.

After delays in obtaining the children's birth certificates, they and Pete finally fly to Boston, and go to Emmadel's house. While she bonds with Bobby and Suzi, Pete discovers that Emmadel is engaged to an aristocratic man, Wilbur Stanley, whose office she works in. She had gotten tired of waiting for Pete's arrival home. The kids stay with her loud parents (drunken father James Barton, a fisherman, and disapproving mother Connie Gilchrist). Pete tries everything to win Emmadel back. She helps him secure a lease on a new house via her fiancé's company. However, when Pete and the children arrive at the house in the rain, they discover that another couple (the McGonigles) also have a lease for the property. Emmadel's fiancé Wilbur shows up to settle the matter. Wilbur offers Pete a ride to another house - but Pete talks him into letting them stay at the Stanley family's gatehouse. They agree to a friendly competition for Emmadel's heart during the few days leading up to the wedding.

Pete and the children settle into the Stanleys' lavish gatehouse, where Emmadel's parents are also staying. Emmadel meets Wilbur's amiable elderly relatives, who present her with $500,000 as a wedding gift. Her parents embarrass her by running screaming through the garden. Emma discovers Pete's presence and visits the gatehouse to have it out with him. After she pulls Suzi's loose tooth, Pete pretends to be in love with Winnifred, Wilbur's fourth cousin twice-removed, and laughs when Emmadel pratfalls on her huge party dress.

Pete reveals his plan to Winnifred Stanley. He discovers that she has long been in love with her cousin Wilbur, but feels too socially awkward to pursue him. In a bit of Pygmalion, Pete teaches Winnifred to feel comfortable with herself. Winnifred's newfound confidence bubbles over at the wedding rehearsal. She and Emmadel erupt in a brawl on the front lawn. Winnifred concedes the fight, and Emmadel declares that she's proud to be a fisherman's daughter.

The wedding day arrives. News reporters line the outdoor chapel, proclaiming this the Cinderella story of the decade. As he escorts Emma down the aisle, Pa Jones tells her that Pete kidnapped the children and ran so they wouldn't be sent back to France. Emmadel begins to have second thoughts. Pete shows up at precisely the wrong moment, handcuffed to a policeman, with both crying kids in tow. Although Wilbur offers to marry Emma and adopt the children, Bobby and Suzi cling sobbing to Pete. On national television, Wilbur abandons his own wedding and forces a reluctant Emma and a protesting (but secretly thrilled) Pete to marry. Pete, Emmadel, Bobby, Suzi, Ma and Pa Jones all ride off for their honeymoon together.

Cast

 Bing Crosby as Pete Garvey, a musician and foreign correspondent
 Jane Wyman as Emmadel Jones, Pete's ex-fiancé who's engaged to Wilbur Stanley
 James Barton as William Jones, Emmadel's funny alcoholic father
 Connie Gilchrist as Ma Jones, Emmadel's loud mother
 Walter Catlett and Ellen Corby as the McGonigles
 Robert Keith as George Degnan, a newspaper man
 Alan Reed as Walter Godfrey
 Minna Gombell as Mrs. Godfrey
 Franchot Tone as Wilbur Stanley
 Alexis Smith as Winifred Stanley, Wilbur's cousin and Emmadel's maid of honor
 H. B. Warner as Uncle Elihu
 Ian Wolfe as Uncle Adam
 Nicholas Joy as Uncle Prentiss
 Maidel Turner as Aunt Abby
 Adeline De Walt Reynolds as Aunt Amy
 Jacques Gencel as Bobby
 Beverly Washburn as Suzi
 Anna Maria Alberghetti as Theresa
 Louis Armstrong as himself
 Cass Daley as herself
 Phil Harris as himself
 Dorothy Lamour as herself 
 Frank Hagney as Passenger on Airplane (uncredited)
 J. Farrell MacDonald as Husband on Airplane (uncredited)

Reception
Bing Crosby arranged for the world premiere of the film to be held in Elko, Nevada on July 30, 1951 and the charitable events associated with it raised $10,000 for the Hospital Building Fund. The New York premiere took place at the Astor Theater on September 20, 1951.

Bosley Crowther of The New York Times commented:

Variety reviewed the film at a tradeshow and said:

Awards and nominations

The film is recognized by American Film Institute in these lists:
 2004: AFI's 100 Years ... 100 Songs:	
 "In the Cool, Cool, Cool of the Evening" – Nominated

Soundtrack
"Caro nome" sung by Anna Maria Alberghetti
"Your Own Little House" (Jay Livingston / Ray Evans): sung by Bing Crosby
"In the Cool, Cool, Cool of the Evening": sung by Bing Crosby and Jane Wyman
"Misto Cristofo Columbo" (Jay Livingston / Ray Evans): sung by Bing Crosby, Louis Armstrong, Cass Daley, Dorothy Lamour and Phil Harris
"Oh Promise Me" few lines sung by Bing Crosby
"Bonne Nuit (Goodnight)" (Jay Livingston / Ray Evans): sung by Bing Crosby 

Bing Crosby recorded four of the songs for Decca Records. "In the Cool, Cool, Cool of the Evening" was in the Billboard charts for six weeks with a peak position of #11. Crosby's songs were also included in the Bing's Hollywood series.

References

External links
  
 
 

1951 films
1951 musical comedy films
1951 romantic comedy films
American black-and-white films
American musical comedy films
American romantic comedy films
American romantic musical films
Films about adoption
Films about weddings
Films directed by Frank Capra
Films that won the Best Original Song Academy Award
Films set in Boston
Paramount Pictures films
1950s romantic musical films
1950s English-language films
1950s American films